Moscariello is an Italian surname. Notable people with the name include:

 Carmen Moscariello (born 1950), Italian poet
 Lucas Moscariello (born 1992), Argentine handball player

Italian-language surnames